Lesbian Concentrate: A Lesbianthology of Songs and Poems is a compilation of music and spoken word by lesbian artists. It was released by Olivia Records in 1977 in response to Anita Bryant's anti-gay crusade "Save Our Children".

The album's cover – a reference to Bryant's role as spokeswoman for the Florida Citrus Commission – has more recently received attention due to its inclusion on several "worst album covers ever" lists.

Critical reception 
Country in Lesbian Tide described the album as "political and cultural, as well as entertaining", that would "leave you spellbound". Ilona Laney in The Body Politic said Lesbian Concentrate was "the best record to give someone as their first album of women's music". In off our backs, Mer described the album as a "mixed bag... but it is also an affirmation of diversity, a striking convergence of different expressions of women". Women's studies scholar Bonnie J. Morris dubbed the album as "the most racially and stylistically diverse" of women's music.

Track listing

References

External links
 Download page from Archive.org (under a CC license)

1977 compilation albums
Lesbian culture in Washington, D.C.
Lesbian-related mass media in the United States
Women's music